The TV Set is a 2006 comedy-drama film written and directed by Jake Kasdan and starring David Duchovny, Sigourney Weaver, Ioan Gruffudd, and Judy Greer. The film follows an idealistic writer attempting to bring his vision for a TV show to fruition on the small screen.

Synopsis
Idealistic scriptwriter Mike Klein (Duchovny) tries to navigate his TV pilot through the mine-laden path of casting, production, and the madness of prime-time scheduling—all while trying to stay true to his vision.  Along the way he has to juggle the agendas of  headstrong network president Lenny (Weaver), volatile young stars, his pregnant wife Natalie (Bateman), and an ever-optimistic personal manager Alice (Greer), while suffering very serious back pain.

Cast
 David Duchovny as Mike Klein
 Sigourney Weaver as Lenny
 Ioan Gruffudd as Richard McCallister
 Judy Greer as Alice
 Fran Kranz as Zack Harper
 Lindsay Sloane as Laurel Simon
 Justine Bateman as Natalie Klein
 Lucy Davis as Chloe McCallister
 Philip Rosenthal as Cooper
 Matt Price as Berg
 Willie Garson as Brian
 M. C. Gainey as Hutch
 Simon Helberg as TJ Goldman
 Kaitlin Doubleday as Jesse Filmore
 Philip Baker Hall as Vernon Maxwell
 Allison Scagliotti as Bethany
 Jonathan Silverman as himself (cameo)
 Seth Green as himself, Slut Wars Host (uncredited)

Production and vision
The film's writer/director Jake Kasdan had originally intended Ben Stiller for the role of Lenny, however Kasdan cast Weaver for the role, which changed his idea of what the character should be. Kasdan does not regard the film as satire, as he sees nothing exaggerated in its depiction of bringing a pilot to production.

Releases
The film was first screened on the Tribeca Film Festival on April 28, 2006. Following almost a year of festival screenings, it was released in cinemas on April 6, 2007. A DVD edition was released through 20th Century Fox on September 25, 2007. It features commentary tracks, a "making of" featurette and a deleted scene.

Reception 
On Rotten Tomatoes the film has an approval rating of 64% based on reviews from 76 critics, with an average score of 6.28/10. The website's critics consensus reads: "Offering both broad and insider jokes, The TV Set is a sharp satire that will please both the average moviegoers and pop culture aficionados."

See also 
 The Big Picture, a film following a similar theme
 Episodes, a TV series following a similar theme
 State and Main, an award-winning comedy film about an obstacle-fraught film production

References

External links
 
 
 

2006 films
American comedy-drama films
2006 comedy-drama films
Films about television
20th Century Fox films
Films directed by Jake Kasdan
Films scored by Michael Andrews
2006 comedy films
2006 drama films
2000s English-language films
2000s American films